Brian Francis Kerr, Baron Kerr of Tonaghmore,  (23 February 19491 December 2020) was a Northern Irish barrister and a senior judge. He held office as Lord Chief Justice of Northern Ireland and then as a Justice of the Supreme Court of the United Kingdom. In 2009, he was the last person to receive a life peerage under the Appellate Jurisdiction Act 1876. At the time of his retirement on 30 September 2020, he was the longest serving Supreme Court Justice, and the last original member of the Court.

Early life
Kerr was born on 23 February 1949 to James William Kerr and Kathleen Rose (née Murray) Kerr of Lurgan, County Armagh.

He was educated at St Colman's College, Newry, and read law at Queen's University Belfast. He was called to the Bar of Northern Ireland in 1970, and to the Bar of England and Wales at Gray's Inn in 1975. He took silk in 1983 and became a member of the Bar of Ireland in 1990, and an Honorary Bencher of Gray's Inn in 1997 and the King's Inns in 2004. He served as Junior Crown Counsel (Common Law) from 1978 to 1983 and Senior Crown Counsel from 1988 to 1993.

Judicial career

Northern Ireland
In 1993, Kerr was appointed a Judge of the High Court and knighted, and in 2004 was appointed Lord Chief Justice of Northern Ireland, only the second Roman Catholic to hold the position, and sworn of the Privy Council.

Kerr regarded the introduction in 1971 of internment without trial in Northern Ireland as having been "calamitous for the rule of law". However, he assessed his Troubles-era experience of the non-jury Diplock courts, introduced to prevent intimidation by paramilitaries, as broadly positive. Citing the "distinguished civil libertarian", Sir Louis Blom-Cooper, he proposed that the non-jury system (in which there was an automatic right of appeal) "was in some senses superior to the jury trial."

As was usual for the Lord Chief Justice of Northern Ireland, he succeeded Lord Carswell as the Northern Irish Lord of Appeal in Ordinary upon the latter's retirement.

United Kingdom Supreme Court
On 29 June 2009, he was created Baron Kerr of Tonaghmore, of Tonaghmore in the County of Down, and was introduced to the House of Lords the same day. He was the last person to be appointed a Lord of Appeal in Ordinary (and therefore the last to be given a life peerage under the Appellate Jurisdiction Act 1876). On 1 October 2009 he became one of the inaugural Justices of the new Supreme Court of the United Kingdom. He was the youngest member, at age 61. He was succeeded as Lord Chief Justice of Northern Ireland on 3 July 2009 by Sir Declan Morgan.

Lord Kerr of Tonaghmore dissented from the controversial judgment of the Supreme Court in R v Gnango, in which the court held that a person could be an accessory to his own murder.

In the 2016 Article 50 "Brexit", and 2019 prorogation of Parliament, cases before the Supreme Court, Lord Kerr was a "close questioner of the government submissions".

Asked to specify which had been his most important case, Kerr opted for the 2018 legal challenge to Northern Ireland abortion law brought by the Northern Ireland Human Rights Commission. The law prohibited abortion, even in cases of rape, incest and fatal foetal abnormality, and four of the seven justices, including Lord Kerr, ruled that this made the law in Northern Ireland incompatible with human rights legislation. "One only has to read the dreadful circumstances of the young women who were courageous enough to give … an account of their experiences in order to be struck how dreadful those experiences were... It was an extremely important case and one which I was very pleased to be part of."

In 2014, Ulster University awarded Lord Kerr an honorary doctorate in law.

In August 2020 it was announced that he would retire on 30 September 2020.

Defence of judicial review
Following his retirement Lord Kerr defended the practice of judicial review and the £56m cost of creating the Supreme Court in Parliament Square. He could understand that ministers might be "irritated by legal challenges which may appear to them to be frivolous or misconceived", butif we are operating a healthy democracy, what the judiciary provides is a vouching or checking mechanism for the validity [of] laws that parliament has enacted or the appropriate international treaties to which we have subscribed... the last thing we want is for government to have access to unbridled power.

Personal life
Kerr married Gillian Widdowson in 1970, and the couple had two sons. 
He was a Roman Catholic.

Lord Kerr of Tonaghmore died in the early hours of 1 December 2020, aged 71.

Lady Kerr died in July 2022.

Arms

See also
 List of Northern Ireland Members of the House of Lords
 List of Northern Ireland members of the Privy Council
 The Public Prosecution Service v William Elliott, Robert McKee
 R (Miller) v Secretary of State for Exiting the European Union
 R (Miller) v The Prime Minister and Cherry v Advocate General for Scotland

References

1949 births
2020 deaths
British King's Counsel
Alumni of Queen's University Belfast
Knights Bachelor
Members of Gray's Inn
Members of the Privy Council of the United Kingdom
Lord chief justices of Northern Ireland
Kerr of Tonaghmore, Brian, Baron
Members of the Judicial Committee of the Privy Council
Judges of the Supreme Court of the United Kingdom
People from Lurgan
20th-century King's Counsel
People educated at St Colman's College, Newry
High Court judges of Northern Ireland